MRCP may be:
 Magnetic resonance cholangiopancreatography, in medical imaging, a technique to visualise the biliary tract and pancreatic ducts.
 Membership of the Royal Colleges of Physicians of the United Kingdom, a postgraduate medical diploma run by the Federation of the Medical Royal Colleges of the United Kingdom
 Media Resource Control Protocol, in computer systems, a communication protocol used by speech servers to provide various speech services
 Master of Regional and City Planning, a variant of Master of Urban Planning
Movement Related Cortical Potentials - an activity in the motor cortex and supplementary motor area  of the brain leading up to voluntary muscle movement